William Taylor (1869 – after 1891) was an English professional footballer who made six appearances in the Football Alliance for Small Heath.

Taylor was born in Smethwick, which was then in Staffordshire. He played for Langley Green Victoria before joining Small Heath in 1891 on the recommendation of Fred Wheldon. He played six games in the Football Alliance and four in the FA Cup, scoring one goal, but the club were unable to find a playing position which suited both Taylor and the team, and he left for Quinton at the end of the 1891–92 season.

References

1869 births
Year of death missing
Sportspeople from Smethwick
English footballers
Association football utility players
Langley Green Victoria F.C. players
Birmingham City F.C. players
Football Alliance players
Date of birth missing
Place of death missing
Association football defenders